The 1974–75  Gonzaga Bulldogs men's basketball team represented Gonzaga University during the 1974–75 NCAA Division I basketball season. Members of the Big Sky Conference, the Bulldogs were led by 
third-year head coach Adrian Buoncristiani and played their home games on campus at Kennedy Pavilion in Spokane, Washington.

Senior guard Ken Tyler was a unanimous selection to the all-conference team; sophomore guard John Holstein and sophomore center Willie Moss were honorable mention.

The conference tournament debuted the following season.

References

External links
Sports Reference – Gonzaga Bulldogs: 1974–75 basketball season

Gonzaga Bulldogs men's basketball seasons
Gonzaga